The Morris Roberts Store, located off U.S. 30 in Hagerman, Idaho, was built in 1892. It was listed on the National Register of Historic Places in 1978.

It is a one-story building with three-foot-thick lava rock walls, with a gabled roof. It has a Western false front architecture facade, including a Mesker Brothers stamped metal cornice. It has two store areas, the west one built in 1892 and the east one built as a bank in 1905. The listing reports it as two contributing buildings.

References

National Register of Historic Places in Gooding County, Idaho
Buildings and structures completed in 1892
1892 establishments in Idaho